William Ball Spencer (sometimes known incorrectly as William Barnett Spencer) (1854-1923) was a British marine painter. He was the son of Richard Ball Spencer.

References

 

19th-century English painters
English male painters
1854 births
1923 deaths
19th-century English male artists